Doris caeca is a species of sea slug, a dorid nudibranch, a marine gastropod mollusc in the family Dorididae.

Distribution
This species was described from 791 to 795 m depth, Banc Combe, in the Pacific Ocean  and a number of sites in the same area, to as far south as New Caledonia  between 650 and 1300 m depth.

References

Dorididae
Gastropods described in 2001